Sidney Bradridge (1 December 1831 – 14 July 1905) was an Australian cricketer. He played one first-class match for New South Wales in 1855/56. In his career he was an architect as of the 1870's.

Bradridge was the son of William Bradridge, an architect who died in 1869. He played cricket for the Fitz Roys club in New South Wales from at least 1848 and was noted as one of their best bowlers, and in 1856 he was selected to represent New South Wales in the states first Intercolonial Cricket match against Victoria. As of 1893 he was among the only surviving members of the first New South Wales side and shared his recollections which included that one or two members of the side had cricketing shoes, the others had ordinary boots, others played only in socks, and one or two played in bare feet.

See also
 List of New South Wales representative cricketers

References

External links
 

1831 births
1905 deaths
Australian cricketers
New South Wales cricketers
Cricketers from Sydney